Luigi Calza also known as Luigi Calza (Calzi) was an Italian Roman Catholic prelate, member of the Xaverian Missionary Fathers, who served as Prefect and Vicar Apostolic in China from 1906 to 1944. He is considered the first Xaverian bishop appointed in China.

Early life 
Calza was born in Parma, Italy on 26 July 1879.

Priesthood 
Luigi became a professed member of the Xaverian Missionary Fathers in year 1897 and was ordained a priest on 24 May 1902 by Bishop Francesco Magani.

Episcopate 
Luigi was appointed Prefect of the Prefecture Apostolic of Western Honan {Ho-Nan Occidentale} nowadays Roman Catholic Diocese of Zhengzhou on 23 June 1906. He was appointed Vicar Apostolic of Prefecture Apostolic of Western Honan {Ho-Nan Occidentale} and Titular Bishop of Termessus (Titular See) on 18 September 1911 and consecrated a bishop by St. Guido Maria Conforti on 12 April 1912.  During the of famine of 1911 to 1913, he opened orphanages for the orphans and set up many schools, training centres and hospitals in Zhengzhou.

Death 
Calza died in China on 27 October 1944.

References 

1879 births
1944 deaths
Italian bishops
20th-century Roman Catholic bishops in China